The Complete Book of Science Fiction and Fantasy Lists is a book written by Malcolm Edwards and Maxim Jakubowski and published in 1983.

Contents
The Complete Book of Science Fiction and Fantasy Lists is a book of lists of science fiction and fantasy stories.

Reception
Dave Langford reviewed The Complete Book of Science Fiction and Fantasy Lists for White Dwarf #48, and stated that "the book has shortcomings. It isn't, the editors admit, complete: they have enough material for another volume, while lots of jokier stuff was cut by Granada though not in the American edition. [...] Buy the book anyway."

Dave Pringle reviewed The Complete Book of Science Fiction and Fantasy Lists for Imagine magazine, and stated that "this volume is a mixture of the informative, the funny and the merely trivial."

Reviews
Review by Dan Chow (1983) in Locus, #274 November 1983 
Review by Nigel Richardson (1983) in Vector 117 
Review by Leo Doroschenko (1984) in Locus, #281 June 1984 
Review by Tom Easton (1984) in Analog Science Fiction/Science Fact, July 1984

References

Science fiction books